Master Keaton is a Japanese anime series, based on the manga series of the same name created by Hokusei Katsushika, Naoki Urasawa, and Takashi Nagasaki. The series was produced by Madhouse, Nippon TV, Shogakukan and VAP and directed by Masayuki Kojima, with Tatsuhiko Urahata handling series composition, Kitarō Kōsaka designing the characters and Kuniaki Haishima composing the music. It was broadcast on Nippon TV between October 6, 1998, and March 30, 1999. Originally consisting of 24 episodes, an additional 15 episodes were created and released as original video animations, bringing the total to 39 episodes. The anime is narrated by Keaton Yamada.

The series follows Taichi Hiraga-Keaton, a freelance insurance investigator who solves cases worldwide, thanks to his archaeological studies at the University of Oxford and his survival and combat training in the Special Air Service. The opening theme "Railtown" is by Kuniaki Haishima. The ending theme for episodes 1–13 is "Eternal Wind" by Blüe,  by Kneuklid Romance for episodes 14–26, and "From Beginning" by Kuniaki Haishima for episodes 27–39. New ending themes were used for the anime's 2007 rebroadcast;  by Kneuklid Romance for episodes 1–13 and "Eber" by Blüe for episodes 14–24.

The anime and OVAs were licensed in North America by Pioneer Entertainment (later named Geneon), with an English dub produced by The Ocean Group. They released eight DVDs between June 10, 2003, and August 10, 2004.

Episode list

TV series (1998–99)

OVA (1999–2000)

References

External links
Master Keaton at VAP 

Master Keaton